Calvin Hemery (born 28 January 1995) is a French tennis player of Nigerian descent.

Hemery has a career high ATP singles ranking of 116 achieved on 30 April 2018. Hemery has a career high ATP doubles ranking of 252 achieved on 24 December 2018.

Hemery made his ATP main draw debut at the 2015 Swiss Open Gstaad where he qualified for the main draw, then lost in the first round to Dušan Lajović.

Hemery was a runner-up at a Futures event in 2013.

In 2015, he won his first singles Futures title in Italy.

He was awarded a wildcard to the 2018 French Open.

Personal life
Calvin Hemery was born in Les Lilas. He is one of few tennis players who are on the vegan diet. He is vegan and animal defender according to his Instagram profile.

Tour finals

Singles (2–5)

References

External links

 
 

1995 births
Living people
French male tennis players
People from Les Lilas
Tennis players from Paris
French people of Nigerian descent
Sportspeople from Seine-Saint-Denis
21st-century French people